Debroy Somers (born William Henry Somers; 11 April 1890, in Dublin – 27 May 1952, in London) was a British twentieth-century big band bandleader.

He had trained as a musician at the Duke of York's Royal Military School in Chelsea, and continued his studies in Dublin under Signor Michele Esposito at The Royal Irish Academy of Music in 1904. At the age of 15 he joined the 2nd Battalion of the Royal Irish Regiment as a boy bandsman before retiring in 1913. He rejoined his old regiment in 1916 retiring as a sergeant musician in 1918; being demobilised in Wiltshire.

His period of celebrity stretched from the 1920s to the 1940s. He appeared in numerous films, including Second Choice, Stars on Parade and Aunt Sally, and founded the 11-piece dance band The Savoy Orpheans. On 15 June 1925, Somers conducted the first British performance of George Gershwin's Rhapsody in Blue from the Savoy Hotel with the Orpheans, alongside the Savoy Havana Band and Gershwin himself on piano. The performance was broadcast live by the BBC.

His ensemble, the Debroy Somers Band, was also known as the Midnight Minstrels. In 1930, they covered "Amy, Wonderful Amy", a song about Amy Johnson. Before the war Somers was a regular broadcaster on Radio Luxembourg, acting as musical director for several regular shows, including the children's show Ovaltineys and Shipmates Ashore for the Merchant Navy. In 1943 he returned to London's West End to direct the hit show The Lisbon Story at the Hippodrome. He was also director for Tom Arnold and Robert Nesbitt's production of Latin Quarter at the London Casino in 1949. His last production was as musical director for George Formby's Zip Goes a Million at the Palace Theatre in 1951, but he collapsed and died during the run of the show in May 1952, aged 62.

Somers married a widow Doddy Payne (nee Watts) on 9 September 1912 in Fulham, London; she already had three children from her previous marriage. The family home remained in Twickenham, Surrey for many years.

Further reading
 Detailed biography at Allmusic
 'William Henry (Debroy) Somers (1890-1952)', Duke of York's Royal Military School

References

1890 births
1952 deaths
British male musicians
Big band bandleaders
Dance band bandleaders
Place of birth missing
20th-century male musicians